Hunsbury Hill Tunnel is a railway tunnel on the Northampton Loop Line of the West Coast Main Line. The tunnel runs in a straight line from the Briar Hill district of Northampton, England about north by east to the East Hunsbury district south of the town. It is about 1 mile south of Northampton railway station and the next station south is Wolverton in Milton Keynes. The tunnel opened together with the rest of the loop line in 1881.

References

Rail transport in Northamptonshire
Buildings and structures in Northamptonshire
Railway tunnels in England
Tunnels in Northamptonshire
Tunnels completed in 1881
1881 establishments in England